St. Mary's Episcopal Church is an historic Episcopal church at 230 Classon Avenue in Clinton Hill, Brooklyn, New York City. It was built in 1858 of Belleville brownstone in the Gothic Revival style.

The building features a square tower with polygonal extension and a broach spire. The Johnson Memorial Parish House was built in 1892. Also on the property is the rectory; a -story brick house with a mansard roof and large oriel window. It was listed on the National Register of Historic Places in 1983.

Parishioners are largely Anglicans of West Indian descent. Community events include concerts, flea markets, brunches, classes, and lectures. In July 2011, the Sacristy of the Church was renovated.

References

External links 

 St Mary's Brooklyn Official site

Episcopal church buildings in New York City
Properties of religious function on the National Register of Historic Places in Brooklyn
Gothic Revival church buildings in New York City
Churches completed in 1858
New York City Designated Landmarks in Brooklyn
19th-century Episcopal church buildings
Churches in Brooklyn